Doctors Building, Doctor's Building, or Doctors' Building may refer to:

 Doctor's Building (Nashville, Tennessee), a six-story commercial building
 Doctors' Building (Cincinnati, Ohio), a historic commercial structure
 W. W. Orr Building in Atlanta, Georgia; also known as the W. W. Orr Doctors' Building

See also
Medical Arts Building (disambiguation)